Cyanoneuron is a genus of flowering plants in the family Rubiaceae. The genus is found on Borneo and Sulawesi.

Species
 Cyanoneuron cyaneum (Hallier f.) Tange - Borneo, Sulawesi
 Cyanoneuron depauperatum (Merr.) Tange - Borneo
 Cyanoneuron grandiflorum Tange - Sarawak
 Cyanoneuron pedunculatum Tange - Sarawak
 Cyanoneuron pubescens (Valeton) Tange - Borneo

References

External links
Cyanoneuron in the World Checklist of Rubiaceae

Rubiaceae genera